Freddy the Freshman is a 1932 Warner Bros. Merrie Melodies animated short film, directed by Rudolph Ising. The short was released on February 20, 1932.

Synopsis
Raccoon coat-clad Freddy the Freshman, "the freshest kid in town" and a canine "big man on campus", crashes a college pep rally, and then proceeds to become the star of the big campus football game.

Background
The cartoon is built around "Freddy The Freshman, The Freshest Kid in Town", a song written by Cliff Friend and Dave Oppenheim and part of the Warner Bros. publishing library. Following its use in this cartoon, "Freddy The Freshman, The Freshest Kid in Town" would turn up as an incidental score cue (usually relating to football in some way) in many later Warner Bros. cartoons. In "Raw! Raw! Rooster!", the song is sung by the character of Rhode Island Red, rival and nemesis to Foghorn Leghorn. A lively version of the tune is heard during a badminton duel in "Bad Ol' Putty Tat". The Freddy the Freshman cartoon short is today in the public domain.

See also
 List of films in the public domain in the United States

References

External links
 
 Freddy the Freshman at the Big Cartoon Database
 Freddy the Freshman at Toon Zone
 

1932 films
1932 animated films
1930s sports films
American black-and-white films
American football films
Films scored by Frank Marsales
Films about dogs
Films directed by Rudolf Ising
Films set in universities and colleges
Merrie Melodies short films
Warner Bros. Cartoons animated short films
1930s Warner Bros. animated short films